The 2017 FIFA Beach Soccer World Cup qualifiers for UEFA was a beach soccer tournament played in Jesolo, Italy, from 2 to 11 September 2016, which determined the four teams that qualify to the 2017 FIFA Beach Soccer World Cup in the Bahamas.

Despite having five allocated spots for European nations at the World Cup, this was reduced to four for the 2017 edition as the World Cup hosts, the Bahamas, automatically claimed one of the two spots allocated to CONCACAF. And so as the confederation with the most slots, one UEFA spot was transferred over to CONCACAF to ensure that two nations would still have the opportunity to qualify from North America.

The format of the tournament was a round-robin group stage followed by the top ranking nations competing in a second round-robin group stage. The four top ranking nations from the second group stage, Poland, Switzerland, Portugal, and Italy, qualified for the World Cup and moved on to the knockout stage to ultimately crown a champion of the event.

Teams and draw
A record 28 teams was planned to compete in this qualifier, one more than in the 2011 edition also held in Italy.

In the draw, held on 3 August 2016, teams were split into four pots according to their European ranking, and drawn into seven groups so that each group included a team from each pot.

Pot 1

 (hosts)

Pot 2

Pot 3

Pot 4

First group stage
The top-two teams from each group and the two best third-placed teams progressed to the second group stage. All times are local time CEST (UTC+2).

Group A

Group B

Group C

Group D

Group E

Group F

Austria withdrew before the start of the tournament due to "administrative reasons" preventing them from travelling to Jesolo. All of the scheduled matches involving them were subsequently cancelled.

Group G

Ranking of third-placed teams

Note: Due to Austria's withdrawal, only results against the each groups' first- and second-placed teams were counted. Results against the teams that finished fourth in their group were discounted.

Second group stage
The group winners advance to the semi-finals and secure qualification for the 2017 FIFA Beach Soccer World Cup.

Group I

Group II

Group III

Group IV

Final stage
The top team from each group in the second stage advance to the semi-finals to play for the title. The other teams eliminated from the second stage advance to classification play-offs (5th to 8th place, 9th to 12th place, 13th to 16th place) depending on their positions.

Play-offs for 13th to 16th place

Semi-finals for 13th to 16th place

Play-off for 15th place

Play-off for 13th place

Play-offs for 9th to 12th place

Semi-finals for 9th to 12th place

Play-off for 11th place

Play-off for 9th place

Play-offs for 5th to 8th place

Semi-finals for 5th to 8th place

Play-off for 7th place

Play-off for 5th place

Play-offs for 1st to 4th place

Semi-finals

Play-off for 3rd place

Final

Awards

Winners

Individual awards
The following awards were given at the conclusion of the tournament.

Goalscorers
25 goals

 Dejan Stankovic

19 goals

 Gabriele Gori

15 goals

 Baris Terzioglu

14 goals

 Noel Ott

13 goals

 Ihar Bryshtel
 Jordan Santos

12 goals

 Bogusław Saganowski

10 goals

 Madjer
 Glenn Hodel
 Cem Keskin

9 goals

 Asif Zeynalov
 Anthony Barbotti
 Artur Paporotnyi
 Ismail Kerem Sinc

8 goals

 David Csoszanszki
 Rui Coimbra

7 goals

 Chiky
 Llorenç Gomez
 Christian Biermann
 Stephane Belhomme
 Boris Nikonorov
 Dmitry Shishin
 Oleh Zborovskyi

6 goals

 Sabir Allahguliyev
 Michal Salák
 Jeremy Basquaise
 Oliver Romrig
 Richard Patocs
 Dario Ramacciotti
 Be Martins
 Leo Martins
 Yuri Krasheninnikov
 Aleksey Makarov
 Oleksandr Korniichuk

5 goals

 Ramil Aliyev
 Jaroslav Kovarik
 Baptiste Bizot
 Michail Kafantaris
 Stylianos Lignos
 Viktor Turos
 Michele di Palma
 Leonid Podlesnov
 Witold Ziober
 Bruno Novo
 Juanma
 Raul Merida

4 goals

 Ilkin Hajiyev
 Georgi Tuzakov
 Didier Samoun
 Thomas Aristeidis
 Theofilos Triantafyllidis
 Andrei Negara
 Karim Madani
 Alan Cavalcanti
 Nuno Miguel Belchior
 Marian Maciuca
 Sandro Spaccarotella
 Ivan Glutskyi
 Yurii Shcherytsia

3 goals

 Orkhan Mammadov
 Dzmitry Shymanouski
 Martin Chalupa
 Filip Vyhnal
 Priit Mäerog
 Ragnar Rump
 Victor Angeletti
 Valon Beqiri
 Anton Kniller
 Sascha Weirauch
 Levan Nadar Leo
 Kacha Todadze
 Keppinho
 Stavros Komiotis
 Stratis Papaefstratiou
 Tamas Szentes-Biro
 Paolo Palmacci
 Nicolae Ignat
 Victor Iordachi
 Jakub Jesionowski
 Piotr Klepczarek
 José Maria Fonseca
 Yuri Gorchinskiy
 Ognjen Ćetković
 Jose Cintas
 Eduard Suarez Molina
 Ezequiel Tracisto
 Volkan Yesilirmak
 Ievgenii Riabchuk

2 goals

 Amid Nazarov
 Renat Sultanov
 Vadzim Bokach
 Dzmitry Kamzolau
 Ivan Miranovich
 Dzianis Samsonov
 Aleh Slavutsin
 Pavel Adamov
 Soren Madsen
 Mitchell Day
 James Temple
 Rasmus Munskind
 Bryan Maison
 Georgi Lovchev
 Vaja Ivaniadze
 Francesco Corosiniti
 Simone Marinai
 Emmanuele Zurlo
 Abylay Yeraly
 Deonis Ciopa
 Sergiu Nicolaiciuc
 Pak-ling Li
 Filip Gac
 Łukasz Stasiak
 Bruno Torres
 Kirill Romanov
 Anton Shkarin
 Antonio Mayor
 Mo Jäggy
 Michael Misev
 Remo Wittlin
 Volodymyr Hladchenko
 Viktor Panteleichuk
 Vitalii Sydorenko

1 goal

 Ivan Kanstantsinau
 Aliaksandr Kavaleu
 Ilia Savich
 Tseno Lozanov
 Kaloyan Tsvetkov
 Patrik Hulina
 Tomás Huráb
 Miroslav Klíma
 Petr Visek
 Lasse Bond
 Tobias Oster
 Scott Lawson
 Tom O'Neill
 Jaime O'Rourke
 Sander Lepik
 Kristian Marmor
 Yannick Fischer
 Julien Soares
 Zurabi Shamiladze
 Georgios Karakasis
 Konstantinos Papastathopoulos
 Rutai Balazs
 Laszlo Berkes
 Kornel Genczler
 Norbert Sebestyen
 Nurzhan Abdrassilov
 Birzhan Orazov
 Viktor Radionov
 Vitaliy Tyulpa
 Victor Bartashevich
 Povilas Malakauskas
 Andrius Rebzdis
 Povilas Smolkovas
 Alexandru Eremia
 Grigorii Gojocari
 Rick Donker
 Maurice Kampman
 Tom Rengers
 Tim Steenks
 Jorgen Jalland
 Johann Kristoffersson
 Henrik Salveson
 Johan Elverum Salveson
 Kamil Kucharski
 Tomasz Lenart
 Ionut Florea
 Catalin Marian Pana
 Ionel Pousteca Pulhac
 Maxim Chuzhkov
 Aleksei Ilinskii
 Riduan Dris
 Fernando Guisado
 Martin Lima
 Marko Radisavljević
 Nemanja Vučićević
 Valentin Jäggy
 Mehmet Aslamaci
 Yasin Bagci
 Semíh Tűrkmen
 Roman Pachev
 Maksym Voitok

Own goals

 Amid Nazarov (playing against Hungary)
 Ervin Stüf (playing against Spain)
 Manuel Mönch (playing against Czech Republic)
 Kornel Genczler (playing against Greece)
 Dmitriy Perevyortov (playing against Russia)
 Alexandr Arefiev (playing against Ukraine)
 Riduan Dris (playing against Azerbaijan)

Final ranking

Qualified teams for FIFA Beach Soccer World Cup
The following four teams from UEFA qualified for the 2017 FIFA Beach Soccer World Cup.

1 Bold indicates champion for that year. Italic indicates host for that year.

References

External links
FIFA Beach Soccer World Cup 2017 – Europe Qualifier Jesolo  at Beachsoccer.com
FIFA Beach Soccer World Cup 2017 – Europe Qualifier Jesolo at Beachsoccerrussia.ru

2016–17 in Italian football
Qualification Uefa
International association football competitions hosted by Italy
2017
2016 in beach soccer
September 2016 sports events in Europe